Henry Moore (1898–1986) was a British sculptor and artist.

Henry Moore may also refer to:

Arts and entertainment
 H. Byron Moore (1839–1925), Australian horse racing official
 Henry Eaton Moore (1803–1841), American composer
 Henry E. Moore, American singing school master
 Henry Moore (painter) (1831–1895), British painter
 Henry Moore  (1898–1986), English sculptor

Nobility
 Henry Moore, 1st Earl of Drogheda (died 1676), Irish peer, Earl of Drogheda
 Henry Hamilton-Moore, 3rd Earl of Drogheda (died 1714), Irish peer, Earl of Drogheda
 Henry Moore, 4th Earl of Drogheda (1700–1727), Irish peer, Earl of Drogheda
 Henry Moore, 3rd Marquess of Drogheda (1837–1892), Irish peer
 Henry Moore, 10th Earl of Drogheda (1884–1957), Irish peer on Chairman of Committees

Politics
 Sir Henry Moore, 1st Baronet (1713–1769), British colonial Governor of New York, Jamaica, etc.
 Henry Moore (Australian politician) (1815–1888), member of the New South Wales Legislative Council
 Henry Dunning Moore (1817–1887), United States Congressman from Pennsylvania
 Henry Monck-Mason Moore (1887–1964), British Governor of Sierra Leone, Kenya and Ceylon

Religion
 Henry Moore (Unitarian) (1732–1802), British minister and hymn-writer
 Henry Moore (biographer) (1751–1844), British Wesleyan minister and biographer of John Wesley
 Henry Moore (priest) (1795–1876), Archdeacon of Stafford
 Henry Moore (bishop) (born 1923), Bishop of Cyprus and the Gulf

Sports
 Henry Moore (baseball) (died 1902), American baseball player
 Henry Moore (cricketer) (1849–1916), English-born cricketer in New Zealand
 Henry W. Moore (1876–1917), Negro leagues baseball player
 Henry Moore (American football) (1934–2023), American football defensive back/halfback
 Henry Moore (footballer, born 2002), Hong Kong footballer

Others
 Henry Moore (police officer) (1848–1918), British policeman
 Henry Ludwell Moore (1869–1958), American economist
 Sir Henry Ruthven Moore (1886–1978), British admiral
 Henry Moore (Colonial Manager), CEO of the South Australian Company, 1901–29
 Henry T. Moore, American academic and the second president of Skidmore College

See also
 Harry Moore (disambiguation)
 Henry Moor (1809–1877), second mayor of Melbourne and Member of Parliament for Brighton
 Henry More (1614–1687), English philosopher
 Henry More (Jesuit) (1586–1661), English Jesuit
 John Henry Moore (disambiguation)